Gianmarco Cangiano (born 16 November 2001) is an Italian footballer who plays as a forward for Eredivisie club Fortuna Sittard, on loan from Bologna.

Club career
On 23 September 2020, he joined Ascoli on loan.

On 29 January 2022, he was loaned to Crotone until 30 June 2022.

On 15 July 2022, Cangiano joined Bari on loan. Having not found regular game time in Apulia, on 11 January 2023 he was re-called by Bologna and subsequently joined Dutch side Fortuna Sittard on another loan until the end of the season, with one option to buy and one to extend the deal for another year.

Club statistics

Club

Notes

References

2001 births
Footballers from Naples
Living people
Italian footballers
Italy youth international footballers
Association football forwards
A.S. Roma players
Bologna F.C. 1909 players
Ascoli Calcio 1898 F.C. players
F.C. Crotone players
S.S.C. Bari players
Fortuna Sittard players
Serie A players
Serie B players
Italian expatriate footballers
Expatriate footballers in the Netherlands
Italian expatriate sportspeople in the Netherlands